Neuilly-Auteuil-Passy or Auteuil-Neuilly-Passy, sometimes referred to just as Passy-Auteuil, is an informal name for the area covering the westernmost districts of Paris (Auteuil and Passy, in the city's 16th arrondissement) and its neighbouring suburban commune, Neuilly-sur-Seine—all of them bordering the Bois de Boulogne and considered to be among the richest areas in and around Paris, with calm, select and very expensive neighbourhoods. The area has been described as "the wealthiest, the most cocksure and, in many ways, the most irritating part of the city." The name became most popular in 1991, when the satiric group Les Inconnus made a song titled "Auteuil, Neuilly, Passy (rap BCBG)".

See also
 Paris Ouest

Notes

16th arrondissement of Paris